uMfolozi Local Municipality (formerly Mbonambi Local Municipality) is a local municipality within the King Cetshwayo District Municipality of KwaZulu-Natal in South Africa. It is situated around the town of KwaMbonambi, to the north of Richard's Bay, stretching from the Indian Ocean to the edge of the Hluhluwe–Imfolozi Park.

It was originally named Mbonambi Local Municipality, renamed to Mfolozi Local Municipality on 21 May 2009,  and renamed again to uMfolozi Local Municipality on 12 February 2015. The name "Mbonambi" refers to the Mbonambi Local Tribal Authority, which covers most of the municipal area. The name Mfolozi/uMfolozi refers to the Umfolozi River which forms the northern boundary of the municipality.

The municipality was enlarged at the time of the South African municipal election, 2016 when part of the disbanded Ntambanana Local Municipality was merged into it.

Main places
The 2001 census divided the municipality into the following main places:

Politics 

The municipal council consists of thirty-five members elected by mixed-member proportional representation. Eighteen councillors are elected by first-past-the-post voting in eighteen wards, while the remaining seventeen are chosen from party lists so that the total number of party representatives is proportional to the number of votes received. 

In the election of 1 November 2021 the Inkatha Freedom Party (IFP) won a narrow majority of eighteen seats on the council. The following table shows the results of the 2021 election.

By-elections from November 2021
The following by-elections were held to fill vacant ward seats in the period from the election in November 2021.

References

External links
 

Local municipalities of the King Cetshwayo District Municipality